John or Jon Fogarty may refer to:

Sportsmen
John Fogarty (baseball) (1864–1918), American baseball player
John Fogarty (footballer, born 1882) (1882–1956), Australian rules footballer for South Melbourne
John Fogarty (footballer, born 1942) (1942–2011), Australian rules footballer
John Fogarty (rugby union, born 1927) (1927–2007), Australian rugby league and union player
John Fogarty (rugby union, born 1977), Irish rugby union player
Jon Fogarty (born 1975), racing driver
Jon Fogarty (footballer) (born 1960), Australian rules footballer for Swan Districts

Other
John Fogarty (Australian politician) (1848–1904), MP and mayor
John Fogarty (judge) (1947–2022), New Zealand lawyer and judge
John Fogarty (priest) (born 1952), Irish Catholic priest
John E. Fogarty (1913–1967), American congressman

See also 
John Fogerty (disambiguation)
Fogarty
Fogerty